The 1952 Tulane Green Wave football team was an American football team that represented Tulane University during the 1952 college football season as a member of the Southeastern Conference. In their first year under head coach Raymond Wolf, the team compiled a 5–5 record.

Schedule

References

Tulane
Tulane Green Wave football seasons
Tulane Green Wave football